Bakhmal Amad Zai is a town and union council of Lakki Marwat District in Khyber Pakhtunkhwa province of Pakistan. It is located at 32°39'39N 70°37'56E and has an altitude of 301 metres (990 feet).

References

Union councils of Lakki Marwat District
Populated places in Lakki Marwat District